Adrian Philip Scarborough (born 10 May 1968) is an English actor.

He has appeared in films including The Madness of King George (1994), Gosford Park (2001), Vera Drake (2004), The History Boys (2006), The King's Speech (2010), Les Misérables (2012) and 1917 (2019). He is also known for his roles in television such as Cranford (2007–2009), Gavin & Stacey (2007–2010; 2019), Upstairs Downstairs (2010–2012), The Paradise (2013),  Crashing (2016),  A Very English Scandal (2018), Killing Eve (2019), and The Chelsea Detective (2022).

Scarborough is also an accomplished theatre actor and has twice won the Laurence Olivier Award for Best Actor in a Supporting Role; he won in 2011 for his role in the Terence Rattigan play After the Dance and in 2020 for his performance in Tom Stoppard's play Leopoldstadt.

Early life
Scarborough was born and raised in Melton Mowbray, Leicestershire. He attended Brooksby Melton College and trained at the Bristol Old Vic Theatre School, winning the Chesterton Award for Best Actor for school graduates.

Career
Scarborough made his big-screen debut in 1994 in The Madness of King George. His other movie appearances have included Sweet Revenge, Gosford Park, Vera Drake, Notes on a Scandal, The History Boys, Elizabeth: The Golden Age, The King's Speech, and Les Misérables.

One of Scarborough's early television roles was J.G. Quiggin in the 1997 adaptation of A Dance to the Music of Time. He was also seen in the BBC series Let Them Eat Cake with Dawn French and Jennifer Saunders. He played "Bouffant", the gay couturier/servant/confidante to Saunder's character, the "Comtesse de Vache". His other appearances on television have included productions such as Cranford, the television film Into the Storm, Psychoville and as Charlie in the BBC comedy series Miranda. He has appeared in three episodes of Midsomer Murders, playing separate characters in series 5, series 10, and series 18. He is also the voice of Abney in the BBC Children's Television programme Abney & Teal. He voiced Benjamin Bunny in The World of Peter Rabbit and Friends.

In 2007, he played the character Harry Hepple in an episode of BBC New Tricks series 4.4 Nine Lives.

Scarborough is particularly well known for his appearances with Julia Davis in the BBC sitcom Gavin & Stacey as warring married couple Pete and Dawn Sutcliffe, who are friends and neighbours of Gavin Shipman's (Mathew Horne) parents in Essex. He is also identified for his role as the butler Mr. Pritchard in the BBC series Upstairs, Downstairs.

In 2012 he appeared in the ITV series Mrs Biggs with fellow Gavin & Stacey star Sheridan Smith, playing the eponymous character's father Bernard (the real-life father of Charmian Brent, ex-wife of Ronnie Biggs). He played an alien known as Kahler-Jex in an episode of Doctor Who entitled "A Town Called Mercy", which aired on 15 September 2012.

On stage, Scarborough has made frequent appearances at the Donmar, the Almeida, and in the West End and he has appeared in twenty productions for the Royal National Theatre. On 19 June 2011, he took part in The Barn Theatre presents... with Elliot Brown at the Barn Theatre, Welwyn Garden City Most recently he has appeared in Hedda Gabler at the Old Vic, again with frequent collaborator Sheridan Smith. In 2013, he played a role in Darkside, Tom Stoppard's radio drama based on Pink Floyd's album The Dark Side of the Moon.
In 2013 he starred in the ITV sitcom Edge of Heaven he played Bald Gary.

In 2015, Scarborough appeared as Clive Trueman in the BBC TV series Father Brown episode 3.15 "The Owl of Minerva". Scarborough also appeared in the Starz sitcom Blunt Talk as Harry, valet to Walter Blunt, a role which he reprised in the second season a year later.

In 2016, Scarborough appeared as Colin in the Channel Four sitcom Crashing and as Tony Pitt in the ITV series Midsomer Murders episode 18.4 "A Dying Art".

In 2017, Scarborough appeared in the film adaptation of Ian McEwan's On Chesil Beach as Lionel Mayhew, as well as alongside David Tennant in Don Juan in Soho as his Chauffeur, for its run in the West End at Wyndham's Theatre.

From 2 to 24 November 2018, Scarborough portrayed Dr Willis in the Nottingham Playhouse production of the Alan Bennett play The Madness of George III, with Mark Gatiss as the king, which follows his role as Fortnum in the 1994 film version of the play. The same year, he was Hal Gallsworthy in the film Christopher Robin. In 2019, Scarborough was Villanelle's handler "Raymond" in the 2nd season of the TV show Killing Eve.

Personal life
Scarborough lives in Berkhamsted, Hertfordshire. He and his wife, Rose (née Blackshaw), have a son named Jake and a daughter named Esme.

Filmography

Film

Television

References

External links
 
 

1968 births
Alumni of Bristol Old Vic Theatre School
English male film actors
English male radio actors
English male stage actors
English male television actors
English male voice actors
Living people
People from Melton Mowbray
People from Berkhamsted
Male actors from Leicestershire
Male actors from Hertfordshire
Laurence Olivier Award winners
20th-century English male actors
21st-century English male actors